The 2000 DecisionPoint Applications Rose City Grand Prix was the eighth round of the 2000 American Le Mans Series season.  It took place at Portland International Raceway, Oregon, on September 10, 2000.

Official results
Class winners in bold.

Statistics
 Pole Position - #77 Audi Sport North America - 1:04.312
 Fastest Lap - #78 Audi Sport North America - 1:04.909
 Distance - 425.485 km
 Average Speed - 154.632 km/h

External links
  
 World Sports Racing Prototypes - Race Results

R
Portland Grand Prix
Rose City Grand Prix
Rose City Grand Prix
Rose City Grand Prix